Hyalina pallida is a species of sea snail, a marine gastropod mollusk in the family Marginellidae, the margin snails.

Description

Distribution
This species occurs in the Gulf of Mexico, the Caribbean Sea and the Lesser Antilles.

References

 Espinosa J. & Ortea J. (1998) Nuevo género y nueva especie de Molusco Gasterópodo maginelliforme (Mollusca: Gastropoda) con rádula taenioglossa. Avicennia 8-9: 113–116.
 Cossignani T. (2006). Marginellidae & Cystiscidae of the World. L'Informatore Piceno. 408pp.
 Rosenberg, G., F. Moretzsohn, and E. F. García. 2009. Gastropoda (Mollusca) of the Gulf of Mexico, Pp. 579–699 in Felder, D.L. and D.K. Camp (eds.), Gulf of Mexico–Origins, Waters, and Biota. Biodiversity. Texas A&M Press, College Station, Texas.
 Fehse D. (2012) Caribeginella Espinosa & Ortea 1998 eine Gattung der Trivioidea (Mollusca: Gastropoda: Littorinimorpha)? Conchylia 42(1-4): 49–50.

External links

Marginellidae
Gastropods described in 1758
Taxa named by Carl Linnaeus